The Little Lion Hunter is a Warner Bros. Merrie Melodies cartoon released to theaters on October 7, 1939. This short was the first of a series of five films featuring the Inki and mynah bird characters.

Plot
Little African boy Inki is out hunting in the jungle with his spear, but has some difficulty in capturing any animals. He is also oblivious to the fact that a ferocious lion has selected him as prey and is sneaking up on him.

Home media
The Little Lion Hunter is available in an unrestored version on both the VHS tape The Best of Bugs Bunny and Friends and the laserdisc The Golden Age of Looney Tunes Volume 2 (side 4).

Voice cast
Mel Blanc as the Lion (uncredited)

References

External links
 

1939 films
1939 animated films
Merrie Melodies short films
Warner Bros. Cartoons animated short films
Short films directed by Chuck Jones
Animated films about birds
Animated films about lions
Animated films without speech
Films about race and ethnicity
Films scored by Carl Stalling
1930s Warner Bros. animated short films